The 1976 CASC Formula Atlantic Players Championship Series was contested over 6 rounds. In this one-make engine formula all drivers had to utilize Ford engines.

Calendar

Final points standings

Driver

For every race the points were awarded: 30 points to the winner, 24 for runner-up, 19 for third place, 15 for fourth place, 12 for fifth place, 10 for sixth place, 9 seventh place, winding down to 1 point for 15th place. No additional points were awarded. All results count.

Formula Atlantic
Atlantic Championship seasons
1976 in Canadian motorsport